Auguste Cazalet (7 September 1938 – 4 June 2013) was a member of the Senate of France, representing the Pyrénées-Atlantiques department. Cazalet was born in Sévignacq-Meyracq, Pyrénées-Atlantiques, and was a member of the Union for a Popular Movement.

References

Page on the Senate website

1938 births
2013 deaths
People from Béarn
Union for a Popular Movement politicians
French Senators of the Fifth Republic
Senators of Pyrénées-Atlantiques